Swiftweasel was a fork of Mozilla Firefox available for the Linux platform only.

Optimization
Swiftweasel is optimized using the following methods:

P.G.O. 
As of the 3.0.3 release, Swiftweasel has shifted its primary optimization from processor specific to profile-guided optimization (PGO). It is a two step building process. The application is compiled one time and then run to produce a profile. The profile is then used to guide a second compilation of the application.
Some of the older optimizations are still used, but there are now only Intel and AMD versions of each build. It is released compiled in a tar.gz package. There are also separate installers for Ubuntu and Arch linux available through their communities.

Binary code optimization
Swiftweasel is compiled with options that optimize for speed rather than binary size.
 Compiled with the -O3 compile flag (the highest level),with the resulting Swiftweasel binary being larger than that of Firefox.
Firefox is compiled with the -Os compile flag, which is for binary size.
Binaries incorporate additional instruction sets:
 Intel and AMD: SSE, SSE2, SSE3, and MMX.
 AMD only: 3DNow!
Optimization specific to the build microprocessor architecture.
 Intel 32bit: Pentium 4 (Prescott), Pentium 4, Pentium M, Pentium III, Pentium II;
 Intel 64bit: Nocona;
 AMD: Athlon XP, Athlon, K6-2, Athlon;
 AMD64: Athlon64, Opteron.
Compiled with newer versions of GCC (Firefox 2.0 uses 3.3.2, Swiftweasel 2.0 uses 4.0.3, and Swiftweasel 3.0.3 uses 4.2.3).
Increased Security
Better protection from Buffer overflow attacks (Swiftweasel 2.0 uses -D_FORTIFY_SOURCE=2; Firefox 2.0 uses gcc 3.x, which does not support this).
Simplify
IPv6 DNS lookups are disabled, preventing slowdowns;
HTTP pipelining is enabled by default. Note that Fasterfox provides a GUI to adjust these settings.
For full details, users can download source packages with all changes listed.

Installed extensions
Swiftweasel has several extensions installed by default.
 XForms
 AdBlock Plus
 User Agent Switcher
 Quick Locale Switcher

Swiftweasel-specific changes
Changes  made to Swiftweasel include:
 The default icon set has been replaced with the Kempelton icon set.
 Swiftweasel uses its own settings directory. The settings, including bookmarks, history, and extensions are imported from Mozilla Firefox the first time Swiftweasel runs.
 Plugins stored in /lib/mozilla/plugins and /lib/Firefox/plugins are detected and used by Swiftweasel.

Swiftdove

The Swiftweasel project also builds optimized 32 and 64bit builds of the Thunderbird email client known as Swiftdove.

Optimizations

As of the current version 2.0.0.21, Swiftdove is also PGO optimized.

Plugins
The 2.0.0.21 builds of Swiftdove include the 0.9 Lightning calendar plugin installed by default.

See also

 Swiftfox

References

External links
 Swiftweasel site
 Software Headlines
 Softpedia review of Swiftweasel 3.0.1
 Browser Wars

Free web browsers
Web browsers based on Firefox
POSIX web browsers
Discontinued web browsers